Toshio Usami (February 22, 1908 – June 1, 1991) was a Japanese field hockey player who competed in the 1932 Summer Olympics. He was born in Aichi Prefecture, Japan. In 1932 he was a member of the Japanese field hockey team, which won the silver medal. He played two matches as forward.

References

External links
 
Toshio Usami's profile at databaseOlympics.com
Toshio Usami's profile at Sports Reference.com

1908 births
1991 deaths
Sportspeople from Aichi Prefecture
Japanese male field hockey players
Olympic field hockey players of Japan
Field hockey players at the 1932 Summer Olympics
Olympic silver medalists for Japan
Olympic medalists in field hockey
Medalists at the 1932 Summer Olympics
20th-century Japanese people